Iverson Latrell Molinar Jones (born December 3, 1999) is a Panamanian professional basketball player for the Wisconsin Herd of the NBA G League. He played college basketball for the Mississippi State Bulldogs.

Early life and high school career
Molinar grew up in Panama City, Panama.
He moved to the United States at age 15 to play for Oaks Christian School in Westlake Village, California. As a junior at Covenant Christian Ministries Academy in Marietta, Georgia, Molinar averaged 21.5 points, six rebounds and five assists per game. He played for Veritas National Prep School as a senior. Molinar also competed for Team Why Not, an Amateur Athletic Union program founded by NBA player Russell Westbrook. He committed to playing college basketball for Mississippi State over offers from Arizona and Arizona State, among others.

College career
On November 21, 2019, Molinar scored a freshman season-high 21 points in an 80–66 win over Tulane. As a freshman, he averaged 5.9 points per game. He missed the first three games of his sophomore season after testing positive for COVID-19. On January 9, 2021, Molinar recorded 24 points, eight rebounds and four steals in an 84–81 victory over Vanderbilt. He was subsequently named Southeastern Conference (SEC) Player of the Week. As a sophomore, Molinar averaged 16.7 points, 3.7 rebounds, and 2.3 assists per game. On January 12, 2022, Molinar scored 28 points in a 88–72 win against Georgia. On January 25, 2022, he scored a career-high 30 points in a 82–74 overtime loss against Kentucky. Molinar was named to the First Team All-SEC as a junior. As a junior, he averaged 17.5 points, 3.6 assists, 3.1 rebounds and 1.2 steals per game. On March 25, 2022, Molinar declared for the 2022 NBA draft while maintaining his college eligibility. He later signed with an agent, forgoing his remaining eligibility.

Professional career

Wisconsin Herd (2022–present)
On November 3, 2022, Molinar was named to the opening night roster for the Wisconsin Herd.

National team career
Molinar played for Panama's junior national teams from the age of 10. He made his debut with the senior national team at the 2017 FIBA AmeriCup, averaging three points per game.

Career statistics

College

|-
| style="text-align:left;"| 2019–20
| style="text-align:left;"| Mississippi State
| 31 || 8 || 15.4 || .489 || .371 || .768 || 1.0 || 1.3 || .3 || .1 || 5.9
|-
| style="text-align:left;"| 2020–21
| style="text-align:left;"| Mississippi State
| 30 || 29 || 32.6 || .478 || .436 || .804 || 3.7 || 2.3 || .9 || .1 || 16.7
|-
| style="text-align:left;"| 2021–22
| style="text-align:left;"| Mississippi State
| 34 || 34 || 34.1 || .454 || .252 || .868 || 3.1 || 3.6 || 1.2 || .4 || 17.5
|- class="sortbottom"
| style="text-align:center;" colspan="2"| Career
| 95 || 71 || 27.5 || .468 || .346 || .831 || 2.6 || 2.4 || .8 || .2 || 13.5

Personal life
Molinar is the son of Leyza Jones and Manuel Molinar. He is named after Hall of Fame basketball player Allen Iverson. He speaks English, Spanish and Italian.

References

External links
Mississippi State Bulldogs bio

1999 births
Living people
Panamanian men's basketball players
Sportspeople from Panama City
Mississippi State Bulldogs men's basketball players
Shooting guards
Panamanian expatriate basketball people in the United States